Moel y Ffridd (also known as Foel y Ffridd) is a mountain in Wales. It lies north-west of the village of Aberangell and west of Mallwyd and is one of the Dyfi Hills.

References 

Mawddwy
Mountains and hills of Gwynedd
Mountains and hills of Snowdonia
Dyfi Hills